Adelpha cocala, the cocala sister or orange-washed sister, is a butterfly of the family Nymphalidae. It was described by Pieter Cramer in 1779. It is found from Honduras to Panama, Guatemala, Venezuela, Colombia, Suriname, Peru, Bolivia and Brazil.

The wingspan is about 50 mm.

The larvae feed on Pentagonia, Psychotria, Calycophyllum, Chomelia, Uncaria and Genipa species.

Subspecies
Adelpha cocala cocala (Venezuela, Colombia, Surinam, Peru, Bolivia, Brazil: Mato Grosso)
Adelpha cocala caninia Fruhstorfer, 1915 (Brazil: Santa Catarina, São Paulo)
Adelpha cocala didia Fruhstorfer, 1915 (Brazil: Espírito Santo, Rio de Janeiro)
Adelpha cocala lorzae (Boisduval, 1870) (Honduras to Panama, Guatemala, Colombia, Ecuador)
Adelpha cocala orellanae Neild, 1996 (Venezuela)
Adelpha cocala riola Fruhstorfer, 1915 (Brazil)

References

 Adelpha cocala at UniProt

Butterflies described in 1779
Adelpha
Fauna of Brazil
Nymphalidae of South America
Taxa named by Pieter Cramer